In probability theory, statistics and econometrics, the Burr Type XII distribution or simply the Burr distribution is a continuous probability distribution for a non-negative random variable.  It is also known as the Singh–Maddala distribution and is one of a number of different distributions sometimes called the "generalized log-logistic distribution". It is most commonly used to model household income, see for example: Household income in the U.S. and compare to magenta graph at right.

The Burr (Type XII) distribution has probability density function:

 

and cumulative distribution function:

Related distributions 

 When c = 1, the Burr distribution becomes the Pareto Type II (Lomax) distribution. 

 When k = 1, the Burr distribution is a log-logistic distribution sometimes referred to as the Fisk distribution, a special case of the Champernowne distribution.

 The Burr Type XII distribution is a member of a system of continuous distributions introduced by Irving W. Burr (1942), which comprises 12 distributions.

 The Dagum distribution, also known as the inverse Burr distribution, is the distribution of 1 / X, where X has the Burr distribution

References

Further reading

External links 

 

Continuous distributions
Systems of probability distributions